Canyon Elementary School District is a public school district which runs one elementary school in the unincorporated community of Canyon, within Contra Costa County, California.

External links
 

School districts in Contra Costa County, California